The men's foil was one of seven fencing events on the Fencing at the 1924 Summer Olympics programme. It was the sixth appearance of the event, which had not been on the programme in 1908. The competition was held from Monday July 1, 1924, to Thursday July 4, 1924. 49 fencers from 17 nations competed. Nations were limited to four fencers each, down from eight in 1920. The event was won by Roger Ducret of France, the nation's third victory in the men's foil. His countryman Philippe Cattiau finished second for the second consecutive Games; Cattiau and Ducret (bronze in 1920) became the second and third men to win multiple medals in the event. Maurice Van Damme earned Belgium's first medal in the men's foil with his bronze.

Background

This was the sixth appearance of the event, which has been held at every Summer Olympics except 1908 (when there was a foil display only rather than a medal event). Three of the 1920 finalists returned: silver medalist Philippe Cattiau and bronze medalist Roger Ducret of France, along with eighth-place finisher Ivan Osiier of Denmark (competing in the Games for the fourth time of his eventual seven). Other notable Olympic veterans included 1912 sixth-place finisher Edgar Seligman and eighth-place finisher Robert Montgomerie of Great Britain. A dispute in the team foil event resulted in the Italian team withdrawing from the fencing tournament without competing in the individual foil—the second time in three Games that an Italy–France matchup was prevented by a dispute (France had withdrawn from the 1912 fencing tournament over a rules dispute).

Argentina, Poland, Portugal, and Uruguay each made their debut in the men's foil. The United States made its fifth appearance, most of any nation, having missed only the inaugural 1896 competition.

Competition format

The event used a five-round format. In each round, the fencers were divided into pools to play a round-robin within the pool. Bouts were to five touches. Standard foil rules were used, including that touches had to be made with the tip of the foil, the target area was limited to the torso, and priority determined the winner of double touches.
 Round 1: There were 12 pools of between 2 and 5 fencers each. The top 3 fencers in each pool advanced to round 2.
 Round 2: There were 6 pools, intended to be of 6 fencers each but one of which had only 5 because a round 1 pool had had only 2 fencers and thus could not advance the full 3. The top 3 fencers in each pool advanced to the quarterfinals.
 Quarterfinals: There were 3 pools of 6 fencers each. The top 4 fencers in each quarterfinal advanced to the semifinals.
 Semifinals: There were 2 pools of 6 fencers each. The top 4 fencers in each semifinal advanced to the final.
 Final: The final pool had 8 fencers.

Schedule

Results

Round 1

The top three fencers in each pool advanced.

Pool A

Pool B

Pool C

Pool D

Pool E

Pool F

Pool G

Pool H

Pool I

Pool J

Pool K

Pool L

Round 2

The top three fencers in each pool advanced.

Pool A

Pool B

Pool C

Pool D

Pool E

Pool F

Quarterfinals

The top four fencers in each pool advanced.

Pool A

Pool B

Pool C

Semifinals

The top four fencers in each pool advanced.

Pool A

Pool B

Final

References

 
 

Foil men
Men's events at the 1924 Summer Olympics